Rik de Voest and Adil Shamasdin were the defending champions but Shamasdin decided not to participate.
de Voest played alongside Karol Beck, but lost in the First Round to Dominic Inglot and Jonathan Marray.
Olivier Charroin and Martin Fischer won the title defeating Evgeny Donskoy and Andrey Kuznetsov in the final 6–4, 7–6(8–6).

Seeds

Draw

Draw

References
 Main Draw

Nottingham Challenge - Doubles
2012 Doubles